Kota Warisan is a township in Dengkil, Sepang District, Selangor, Malaysia. The developer of the 600-acre township is Gema Padu. Since 1997, the township's 350 acres have been developed, and more than 4,000 residential and commercial units have been completed as of 2011. The airport, stores at Kuala Lumpur International Airport (KLIA) and the low-cost carrier terminal and airline workers, as well as the working population in Cyberjaya and officials from Putrajaya, are the targeted group of residents in the township. 
Serenia City by Sime Darby Property, Sunsuria City by Sunsuria Group, KIP Sentral by KIP Group, Warisan Puteri by IOI Properties Group, and Saujana KLIA by Glomac are some recent township projects in the vicinity of the township.

Access

Car
North–South Expressway Central Link  runs along the southern boundary of the township and can be accessed via Exit 609, Bandar Serenia Exit, and also through Federal Route 29.

Public transportation
The closest rail station is  ERL Salak Tinggi, about 2.3 km west.

References 

Sepang District
Townships in Selangor